Master Mota Singh (28 February 1888 - 9 January 1960) was an Indian patriot and revolutionary.

He was born on 28 February 1888 at Patara, a village 7 km east of Jalandhar, British Punjab.

References

Indian Sikhs
People from Jalandhar district
1960 deaths
1888 births